Sir Geoffrey Fitzhervey de Montmorency  (23 August 1876 – 25 February 1955) was an Anglo-Irish colonial administrator. He was Governor of the Punjab.

Work 
He was born in the townland of Castlemorris, near Knocktopher, in County Kilkenny, to Waller de Montmorency, a Church of Ireland clergyman, and Mary O'Brien. He is buried in the Parish of the Ascension Burial Ground in Cambridge.

References

 ‘DE MONTMORENCY, Sir Geoffrey Fitzhervey’, Who Was Who, A & C Black, an imprint of Bloomsbury Publishing plc, 1920–2008; online edn, Oxford University Press, Dec 2012 ; online edn, Nov 2012 accessed 11 March 2013

Specific

1876 births
1955 deaths
20th-century Anglo-Irish people
Commanders of the Order of the British Empire
Governors of Punjab (British India)
Knights Commander of the Royal Victorian Order
Knights Commander of the Order of the Star of India
Knights Grand Commander of the Order of the Indian Empire
People from County Kilkenny
British people in colonial India